Year 1205 (MCCV) was a common year starting on Saturday (link will display the full calendar) of the Julian calendar.

Events 
 By place 

 Byzantine Empire 
 Spring – Theodore I (Laskaris) is proclaimed Byzantine emperor (or basileus), formally founding the Empire of Nicaea, after repelling the invasions of rivals David Komnenos and Manuel Maurozomes into his domains. His appointment is an open challenge to the legitimacy of the Latin emperor Baldwin I, who rules over large parts of the former Byzantine Empire and regards Theodore as a usurper.
 March 19 – Battle of Adramyttion: The Byzantine army under Constantine Laskaris (brother of Theodore I) appears before the walls of Adramyttium – surprising the Latin garrison. Meanwhile, Henry of Flanders not wanting to remain trapped within the city, opens the gates and charges out with his heavy cavalry. He and his knights defeat the Byzantine forces, who are scattered and forced to retreat.
 March – Byzantine officials in Adrianople revolt and expel Latin administrators, requesting Bulgarian support from Kaloyan, ruler (tsar) of the Bulgarian Empire, against Baldwin I who assembles an army (some 40,000 men) and marches to aid the Byzantines. Meanwhile, Baldwin sets out from Constantinople in force, he arrives at Adrianople and promptly begins to siege the city by the end of March.
 April 14 – Battle of Adrianople: Latin forces under Baldwin I are defeated and eliminated in a successful ambush by Bulgarians, Vlachs and Cumans. Baldwin is captured and taken as prisoner to Veliko Tarnovo – where he is locked up at the top of a tower in the Tsarevets fortress. Later, Baldwin is possibly executed by orders of Kaloyan (this according to the Byzantine historian George Akropolites).
 Summer – Battle of Koundouros: Byzantine forces (some 5,000 men) under Michael Doukas, governor of the Theme of the Peloponnese (and later Despot of Epirus), tries to stop the Latin army (some 700 knights and foot soldiers) at the Olive Grove of Koundouros. The Byzantines are defeated by William of Champlitte, who later founds the Principality of Achaea (a vassal state of the Latin Empire).
 Othon de la Roche, a Burgundian nobleman, founds the Duchy of Athens (one of the Crusader states set up in Greece) and takes the title of "Grand Lord" (Megaskyr) in Athens.

 Europe 
 January 6 – Philip of Swabia becomes King of the Romans and is crowned again with great ceremony at Aachen by Archbishop Adolf of Cologne. After several threats, Adolf is removed from office by Pope Innocent III and excommunicated, on July 19. Philip is able to increasingly assert his kingship against Otto of Brunswick (who is also crowned king of Germany) in the northern parts of the Alps.
 May 29 – Andrew II, brother of the late King Emeric, is crowned ruler of Hungary and Croatia at Székesfehérvár, after his 5-year-old nephew, Ladislaus III, suddenly dies in Vienna. Andrew introduces a new policy for royal grants, which he calls "new institutions". He distributes large portions of his domain–such as royal castles and all estates attached to them–to supporters and Hungarian nobles.
 June 19 – Battle of Zawichost: Polish forces under High Duke Leszek I (the White) defeat the Kievan army at Zawichost. During the ambush, Roman Mstislavich, Grand Prince of Kiev, is killed. He is succeeded by his two infant sons, Daniel and Vasilko. Their principalities are ruled by their mother Anna of Byzantium, but the boyars of Galicia–Volhynia forces her and the young princes into exile.
 Summer – King Philip II (Augustus) conquers most of the Angevin lands, including much of Aquitaine. Fearing a French invasion of England  itself, King John (Lackland) requires every English male over 12 years to enter a mobilization "for the general defense of the realm and the preservation of peace". John prepares an expedition force of his own, but the barons refuse to cross the Channel.

 England 
 William of Wrotham, Lord Warden of the Stannaries, oversees a reform of English currency. In keeping with other high-ranking bureaucrats of his time, this is just one of Wrotham's many offices. He is also "keeper of ports", the forerunner of the First Lord of the Admiralty, supervisor of the mints of Canterbury and London, ward of the vacant Diocese of Bath and Wells and archdeacon of Taunton.

 Levant 
 April 1 – Aimery of Cyprus, king of Jerusalem, dies of food poisoning caused by white mullet. He is succeeded by his 9-year-old son Hugh I as ruler of Cyprus. His mother, Queen Isabella I becomes regent over the young boy, but she dies suddenly four days after her husband. The High Court of Cyprus appoints Walter of Montbéliard (brother-in-law of Aimery) as regent and Hugh's guardian.

 Africa 
 Caliph Muhammad al-Nasir establishes Almohad domination over the eastern parts of Ifriqiya (modern Tunisia). He appoints General Abu Mohammed ibn Abi Hafs as governor of Ifriqiya.

 By topic 

 Religion 
 July 15 – Pope Innocent III lays down the principle that Jews are doomed to perpetual servitude, because they had crucified Jesus.

Births 
 January 26 – Li Zong (or Zhao Yun), Chinese emperor (d. 1264)
 March (or May) – Elisabeth of Swabia, queen of Castile and León (d. 1235)
 July 10 – Hōjō Masamura, Japanese nobleman (d. 1273)
 November 5 – As-Salih Ayyub, Ayyubid ruler (d. 1249)
unknown dates
 Bruno von Schauenburg, Bohemian bishop (d. 1281)
 Demetrius of Montferrat, king of Thessalonica (d. 1230)
 Jirjis al-Makin Ibn al-'Amid, Egyptian historian and writer (d. 1273)
 Guy I de la Roche, duke of Athens and Thebes (d. 1263)
 Wenceslaus I (One-Eyed), king of Bohemia (d. 1253)
probable 
 Azzo VII d'Este, Italian nobleman and knight (d. 1264)
 Batu Khan, Mongol ruler of the Golden Horde (d. 1255)
 Walter IV (the Great), French nobleman (d. 1246)

Deaths  
 January 2 – Baldwin II, French nobleman and knight
 April 1 – Aimery of Cyprus (or Amaury), king of Jerusalem 
 April 5 – Isabella I, queen and regent of Jerusalem (b. 1172)
 April 14 
 Garnier de Traînel (or Traisnel), French bishop 
 Louis I, French nobleman and knight (b. 1172)
 May 7 – Ladislaus III, king of Hungary and Croatia (b. 1200)
 May/June – Enrico Dandolo (or Henry), doge of Venice (b. 1107)
 June 14 – Walter III (or Gautier), French nobleman 
 June 19 – Roman Mstislavich, Kievan prince (b. 1152)
 July 4 – Otto II (the Generous), German nobleman 
 July 10 – Hatakeyama Shigeyasu, Japanese samurai
 July 13 – Hubert Walter, archbishop of Canterbury
 August 8 – Savaric FitzGeldewin, English bishop
unknown dates
 Alan IV (the Young), viscount of Rohan (b. 1166)
 Alexios Aspietes, Byzantine governor and usurper
 Sibylla of Acerra, queen and regent of Sicily (b. 1153)
probable – Baldwin I, emperor of the Latin Empire (b. 1172)

References